Gary Lloyd Barnett (born 11 March 1963) is an English former professional footballer and football coach. He made nearly 400 appearances in the Football League playing as a midfielder for Oxford United, Wimbledon, Fulham, Huddersfield Town, Leyton Orient and Kidderminster Harriers. As player-manager of League of Wales club Barry Town, he was honoured with the League of Wales Manager of the Year award in three consecutive seasons, for leading the club to a succession of domestic honours and to the First Round proper of the 1996–97 UEFA Cup.

References

External links
 
 

1963 births
Living people
People from Stratford-upon-Avon
English footballers
Association football midfielders
Coventry City F.C. players
Oxford United F.C. players
Wimbledon F.C. players
Fulham F.C. players
Huddersfield Town A.F.C. players
Leyton Orient F.C. players
Barry Town United F.C. players
Kidderminster Harriers F.C. players
Cymru Premier players
English football managers
Barry Town United F.C. managers
Cymru Premier managers